The following list of Concordia University people includes notable administrators, alumni and faculty of Concordia University, and its predecessors Loyola College and Sir George Williams University.

Rectors and presidents
The following is a list of rectors and presidents of Concordia University, and its predecessors, Loyola College and Sir George Williams University.

Chancellors
The following is a list of chancellors of Concordia University, and its predecessor Sir George Williams University.

Notable faculty
 Marguerite Andersen - writer and educator
Theresa H. Arriola - cultural anthropologist
 Margaret Atwood - poet, author and literary critic (instructor in English, 1967)
 William P. Byers - professor emeritus of mathematics; author of How Mathematicians Think and The Blind Spot
 Ed Enos - Founding Chairman of the Concordia Department of Exercise Science, an Associate Professor of the department, a former Assistant Dean, Faculty of Arts and Science, and a member of Concordia's first Senate
 Marc Gervais - film professor, Jesuit, and founding director of the Loyola Institute for Studies in International Peace
 Henry Habib - distinguished professor emeritus 
 Michael Laucke - classical guitar (professor of guitar in 1976 to 1977)
 Kai Nielsen - adjunct professor in the philosophy department, contemporary atheist and left-wing political philosopher
 Mordecai Richler - author (writer-in-residence)
 Vaira Vīķe-Freiberga - former president of Latvia; first female president of Latvia

Concordia
 Gordon Graham - former professor
 Fariborz Haghighat - distinguished professor
Gad Saad - YouTube personality
 Jane Stewart - distinguished professor emeritus of psychology

Notable alumni

Sir George Williams
 Howard Alper - chemist
 Sacvan Bercovitch - professor, Harvard University
 David Bercuson - historian
 Lawrence Bergman - Quebec provincial politician
 Warren Cohen - composer and conductor
 Terry Copp - military historian
 Rosie Douglas - former Prime Minister of Dominica
 William McLean Hamilton - Ontario federal politician
 Jim Hawkes - Canadian federal politician
 Stuart McLean - broadcaster and author
 Henry Mintzberg - professor, McGill University
 Guido Molinari - artist
 Gordon O'Connor - Canadian Minister of National Revenue
 Richard Patten - Canadian federal politician
 Richard Pound - Chairman of the World Anti-Doping Agency; Chancellor of McGill University
 E. Annie Proulx - author, winner of the Pulitzer Prize for Fiction
 Mordecai Richler - author
 Alfie Roberts - political activist, professional cricketer, and Montreal community worker
 George Springate - professional football player and Quebec politician
 Rod Sykes - former leader of the Alberta Social Credit Party and former Mayor of Calgary
 Donald Tarlton - as Donald K. Donald, a preeminent Montreal-based concert promoter, music manager and record label owner
 Theodore Fairhurst - artist, real estate entrepreneur, world record holder mountain climber

Loyola
 Samir Atallah - a Lebanese journalist, author & columnist, in An-Nahar and Asharq Al-Awsat.
 Tony Burman - journalist and editor-in-chief at CBC
 Lucien Cardin - Canadian federal politician
 Larry Carriere - former NHL hockey player, current assistant general manager of the Montreal Canadiens
 Dominic D’Alessandro - President and CEO of Manulife Financial
 Don Ferguson - actor and comedian
 Hana Gartner - journalist
 Marc Gervais (1950) - Jesuit and film professor at Concordia University
 Bernard Lonergan - philosopher and theologian; regarded as one of the most important thinkers of the 20th century
 John C. Major - justice of the Supreme Court of Canada
 Brian McKenna - journalist
 Richard Monette - actor and director
 Athol Murray - priest and educator
 Georges Vanier - former Governor General of Canada

Concordia
Alex Tyrrell - leader of the Green Party of Quebec.
 Nadia Myre  - Visual artist
 Dareen Abughaida - Al Jazeera news anchor
 Yasser Harrak - writer, commentator, human rights activist 
 Pietro Amato - musician
 Louise Archambault - film director and screenwriter
 Torill Kove - film director and animator and winner of 2007 Academy Award for Animated Short Film
 Jérémy Comte - film director 
 Will Arnett - actor, Arrested Development TV series; left after one semester to pursue acting
 Melissa Auf der Maur - rock musician
 Maziar Bahari - journalist and filmmaker, Newsweek
 René Balcer - Emmy Award-winning writer and producer, Law & Order and Law & Order: Criminal Intent
 Chris Banks - poet
 Yves Bélanger - cinematographer
 Evan Beloff - screenwriter and director
 Andy Borodow (born 1969) - Canadian Olympic wrestler, Maccabiah champion, Commonwealth champion
 Pan Bouyoucas - author, playwright and translator
 Annie Briard - artist
 Edwin Orion Brownell - neo-classical composer and concert pianist
 Gary Burns - screenwriter and director
 Brian Busby - author
 Pascale Bussières - Québécoise actress
 Cecil Castellucci - author
 Régine Chassagne - musician, Arcade Fire
 Gina Cody - engineer
 Warren Cohen - composer and conductor
 Steven Cojocaru - fashion maven; Entertainment Tonight correspondent (2003–present)
 Karen Connelly - author
 Daniel Cross - filmmaker
 Joe David - Nuu-chah-nulth artist
 Barbara Davidson - Photographer, 2011 Pulitzer Prize winner
 Bob Delaney - Ontario provincial politician
 André Desmarais - President and Co-CEO of Power Corporation of Canada
 Ann Diamond - poet and short story writer
 Kadie Karen Diekmeyer - Canadian internet personality and animal rights activist
 Farell Duclair - Canadian football player
 Mario Dumont - ex-political leader of the provincial ADQ party
 Barbara Dunkelman - Canadian actress and internet personality
 Darren Entwistle - President and CEO of Telus
 Jocelyn Faubert - professor at the University of Montreal
 Sydney Finkelstein - professor at the Tuck School of Business at Dartmouth College
 Raymonde Folco - Canadian federal politician
 Tess Fragoulis - author
 Elyse Gasco - author
 Erin Gee - media artist
 Mireille Gingras - neurobiologist; founder and CEO of HUYA Bioscience International
 Jonathan Goldstein - Author, humorist, and radio host
 Angela Grossmann - artist
 Rawi Hage - novelist, photographer
 Yasser Harrak - writer and human rights activist
 Richard Harrison - poet
 Paul Hartal - painter, poet
 Elisabeth Harvor - author
 Mohamed Hashish - research scientist
 Stephen Henighan - author
 Christopher Hinton - film animator
 Jennifer Hollett - former MuchMusic VJ
 Anna Hopkins - actress
 Anthony Housefather - Mayor of Côte Saint-Luc, Quebec, Member of Parliament
 Geof Isherwood - comic book illustrator
 Clément Jodoin - ice hockey coach
 Emmett Johns - founder of Dans la Rue
 Clark Johnson - American actor, Homicide: Life on the Street TV series
 Christine Jones - Scenic designer 
Garry Kallos (born 1956) - Olympic wrestler and sambo competitor
 Ibi Kaslik - author
 Mark Kelley - CBC reporter
 Adam Kelly - writer
 Jonah Keri - author
 Arsinée Khanjian - actress
 Donovan King - theatre artist
 Torill Kove - animator; 2006 Academy Award winner
 Spencer Krug - musician, Wolf Parade, Sunset Rubdown, Frog Eyes, Swan Lake, Fifths of Seven
 Micheline Lanctôt - film director and actress
 Michelle Latimer - actress on Paradise Falls (Showcase)
 Jeannie Lee - broadcast journalist
 Peter Lenkov - writer and producer, CSI: NY; left to pursue a career in writing and producing
 JJ Levine – photographer
 Tony Loffreda - Canadian Senator and former banker
 Kate Lushington - theatre artist and teacher
 G. Scott MacLeod - painter
 Robert Majzels - playwright
 Arefeh Mansouri - Iranian fashion and costume designer
 Catherine Martin - screenwriter and director
 Gerald T. McCaughey - President and CEO of the Canadian Imperial Bank of Commerce
 Steve "Liquid" Hawley - member of music group Bran Van 3000
 Annie Murphy - actor, Schitt's Creek TV series
 Lee Mellor - musician and author
 Milosh - electronic musician
 John Moore - Canadian broadcaster, actor, and voice actor
 Mila Mulroney - wife of former Prime Minister Brian Mulroney
 Mohan Munasinghe - physicist and Vice-Chair of the Intergovernmental Panel on Climate Change that shared the 2007 Nobel Peace Prize
 Glen Murray - former mayor of Winnipeg
Onye Nnorom – physician and President of the Black Physicians' Association of Ontario
 Andrea Paine - Canadian federal politician
 B. P. Paquette - filmmaker and academic
 Richard Reed Parry - musician, Arcade Fire
 Lionel Perez - member of Montreal City Council
 Mykola Plaviuk - Ukrainian social and political activist in emigratio; served as the last President of the Ukrainian People's Republic in exile
 Antoni Porowski - chef, actor, and television personality
 Steve Prentice - founder of The Bristall Group
 Andrew Princz – journalist, editor, publisher
 David James Ramsay - Ontario provincial politician
 Edeet Ravel - author
 Nino Ricci - author
 Diane Roberts - theatre director
 Vittorio Rossi - playwright, actor
 Rodolphe Saadé - French billionaire businessman
 Francis Scarpaleggia - Canadian federal politician
 Mark Shainblum - author and comic book creator
 Artyom Shneyerov - economist
 Alvin Shrier - professor of physiology and Hosmer Chair in Physiology at McGill University
 Johanna Skibsrud - author, winner of the Giller Prize
 Hanibal Srouji - artist
 Jana Sterbak - artist
 Christina Stojanova - media historian
 EE Storey - designer
 Moez Surani - poet
 Todd Swift - poet
 Mutsumi Takahashi - CTV news anchor
 Ruth Taylor - poet
 Michael Thompson - Toronto politician
 Nicholas Thorburn - rock musician
 James Tupper - actor, Men In Trees TV series, Big Little Lies TV series
 Todd van der Heyden - CTV news anchor
 Mariloup Wolfe - actress
 Steven Woloshen - animator
 David Zilberman - Olympic heavyweight wrestler

References

 
Concordia
Concordia University